Jacob and Esau is a 1963 Italian religious epic drama film written and directed  by Mario Landi and starring Edmund Hashim and Ken Clark in the title roles.

Plot

Cast
Edmund Hashim as Jacob
Ken Clark as Adult Esau
Fosco Giachetti as Isaac
Elisa Cegani as Rebekah
Massimo Serato as Ishmael
Ennio Girolami as Young Esau
Wandisa Guida as Judith
Aldo Silvani

References

External links

Jacob and Esau at Variety Distribution

Peplum films
1960s adventure drama films
Films directed by Mario Landi
Cultural depictions of Judith
Films based on the Hebrew Bible
Sword and sandal films
1963 drama films
1963 films
1960s Italian-language films
1960s Italian films